Heklina is the stage name of Stefan Grygelko, an American actor, drag queen, and entrepreneur in San Francisco. Grygelko's mother is Icelandic, and having been born in the U.S., he lived in Iceland in the 1980s; he named his drag character after the Icelandic volcano Hekla. Heklina founded the drag club Mother (formerly Trannyshack) in 1996.

Career

Mother (formerly Trannyshack)

Heklina co-founded Trannyshack, and has hosted the show from its inception in 1996 at the Stud bar and continues to host the special events throughout San Francisco and in other – mainly California – cities. Trannyshack is the longest running drag event series in San Francisco. On January 17, 2015 at The Oasis, Trannyshack was rebranded as Mother, evolving from a monthly to a weekly event series.

She also co-produces and co-hosts the Miss Trannyshack Pageant widely considered the premiere annual drag event in San Francisco that has sold out every year since inception.

Theater and community actitivites

Heklina also acts in local theater productions, most notably the S.F. Golden Girls productions (as Dorothy Zbornak) and emcees a variety of community and charitable events including the Folsom Street Fair (along with Sister Roma) and San Francisco Pride. She was voted Community Grand Marshal of the 2004 San Francisco GLBTQ Pride Parade, and won the 2009 Pride Creativity Award for Outstanding Artistic Contribution to the LGBT Community. She was sainted by the Sisters of Perpetual Indulgence. Heklina co-stars in a series of short films, the "Tran-ilogy of Terror", drag queen horror spoofs written and directed by long-time collaborator Peaches Christ., and also starred in the film "Baby Jane?".

The Oasis

The Oasis, a theater and cabaret nightclub located in San Francisco's SOMA district, hosted a grand opening event on New Year's Eve day 2014. Heklina and three business partners, D'Arcy Drollinger, Geoff Benjamin, and Jason Beebout, signed a deal to purchase the former Oasis nightclub in October 2014. The nightclub's diverse programming features drag stars, cabaret and performing artists, live musical acts, and DJs.

Filmography
 Filthy Gorgeous: The Trannyshack Story (2005) 
 The House of Venus Show" (2006)
 Spin the Bottle (2005)
 Season of the Troll (2001)
 A Nightmare on Castro Street (2002) 
 Whatever Happened to Peaches Christ? (2004)
 "Baby Jane?"Television
 "The Cho Show" with Margaret Cho
 "Trauma" (2009) 
 "The Daily Show"Playing It Straight'' (2004)
 The Ricki Lake Show
 Jerry Springer
 Judge Steve Harvey

References

External links
 Heklina's Official Facebook Page
 Heklina's YouTube video channel
 videos of Heklina's performances and Filthy Gorgeous, The Trannyshack Story
 SF Oasis : The Club
 Heklina Talks About Mother, The New Incarnation Of Trannyshack At The Oasis 

American drag queens
Culture of San Francisco
Year of birth missing (living people)
Living people
Actresses from San Francisco
American film actresses
American television actresses
American people of Icelandic descent
21st-century American women